The Russian chemical industry is a branch of Russian industry.

The chemical industry's share of Russia's GDP in 2006 was about 6% of exports.

In 2009 it exported 3.1 million tons of ammonia in the amount of 626 million dollars, 814 thousand tons of methanol in the amount of 156 million dollars, 22 million tons of mineral fertilizers worth $5.6 billion, 702 thousand tons of synthetic rubber in the amount of 1, $2 billion.

The average monthly wage in the chemical industry in March 2010 was 21956 RUR / month. The Russian chemical industry was facing problems in 2014 due to the sanctions imposed on Russia by Western nations.

Enterprises 

TogliattiAzot — world's largest producer of ammonia . The main products are ammonia, fertilizers, methanol . Total turnover in 2008 — 29.97 bln rubles.

Ural Plant of Industrial Gases (Uraltehgaz)  — produces technical gases and cryogenic liquids, food gas mixtures, welding gas mixtures, cylinders and welding equipment.

References 

 
Ru
Industry in Russia